Paganella is a mountain of the Brenta Group in Trentino, northern Italy. It is located in the territories of the comuni of Fai della Paganella, Andalo, Molveno, Zambana and Terlago. Overlooking Trento from north-west, it consists of a short range/plateau with a highest elevation of 2,125 m (Roda Peak).

The slopes above Andalo and Fai are rich in vegetation and also houses several ski resorts, while the other descends towards the Adige river are steeper and rockier.

Climate 
Due to altitude, the climate is tundra (Köppen: ET), similar to other high mountains in the Alps.

References

External links

Mountains of the Alps
Mountains of Trentino